Mario Bettinus (Italian name: Mario Bettini; 6 February 1582 – 7 November 1657) was an Italian Jesuit philosopher, mathematician and astronomer. The lunar crater Bettinus was named after him by Giovanni Riccioli in 1651.

Biography 
Mario Bettinus studied mathematics under the Belgian Jean Verviers and Giuseppe Biancani at the Jesuit school in Parma. He was responsible for teaching military architecture in Parma during the period 1624–1630. Among the students attending his classes at the seminarium nobilium were the two sons of Duke Ranuccio, Ottavio and Odoardo. Besides being Ottavio's teacher of military mathematics, Bettinus also served as military consultant to the courts of Parma (1612–1613), Modena (1617–1618) and again Parma (1626–1627), and as a military architect at Novellara (1618–1619), seat of the novitiate of the Jesuit ‘Provincia Veneta’.

Besides being the mentor of Guarino Guarini (1624–1683), Bettinus was also a close friend of Prince Raimondo Montecuccoli (1609–1680)—the latter had even sent him a copy of his work on fortifications from Hohenneg on 15 July 1652.

Works 
Bettinus privileged mathematics, intended as the only discipline abstract enough to allow intellect to approach theology. The Jesuit mathematician held the belief that, precisely because of their abstraction, mathematical theorems and demonstrations lead one away from the mundane and toward the divine.﻿ On the contrary, he considered a research based on sense as ﻿ too bound to human limitations (and, therefore, unreliable). Yet, Bettinus was a skilled astronomer; and clues of experimental knowledge are all but invisible in his work.  

His best-known work is Apiaria Universae Philosophiae Mathematicae 'Beehives of all mathematical philosophy' (1645), an encyclopedic collection of mathematical curiosities. This book, reflecting his many interests, is a collection of scientific mysteries embracing everything from geometrical demonstrations to illusionistic stage sets, music, perpetual motion machines, and anamorphoses. According to Bettinus, the natural world abounds in mathematical delights such as spider webs and the honeycombs of bees. From these creations of nature can be drawn geometrical principles useful for mechanical, optical, and artistic designs. This work had been reviewed by Christoph Grienberger.

In his Apiaria military technologies featured prominently. His machines of war were mentioned by Montecuccoli, by the famous Jesuit mathematicians Athanasius Kircher and Jacques Ozanam and by the Polish master of artillery, Casimir Semenowycz. This book must have been rated highly by the English physician and philosopher Sir Thomas Browne, for a copy can be found in his library.

Bettinus' work included a commentary on the first six books of Euclid, a traditional part of Jesuit mathematical curriculum and a form followed by Clavius a half century earlier. Bettinus penned a method for laying out a sundial which was posthumously published in the book Recreationum Mathematicarum Apiaria Novissima 1660.

Publications

Apiaria Universae Philosophiae Mathematicae, in quibus Paradoxa, et nova pleraque machinamenta ad usus eximios traducta et facillimis demonstrationibus confirmata exhibentur, 3 vols. Bologna: Typis Io. Baptistae Ferronij, Venice: Apud Paulum Baleonium, 1642–55. The 'paradoxes' are of many different kinds—scientific ideas contrary to general opinion, logical and mathematical paradoxes, geometrical problems which had not yielded to solution, curious machines and engines, illusions, games, and tricks. Bettinus tackled the 'learned hallucinations' constellated about the quadrature problem, and about asymptotic lines which go de infinito infinito, as well as those that result from deformation of the rules of perspective. Archimedes' screw (which raised by lowering itself), wedges, levers all make their appearance, magnificently illustrated.

See also
List of Jesuit scientists
List of Roman Catholic scientist-clerics

References

External links
Bettinus' (1642, 2 vol.) Apiaria universae philosophiae mathematicae - Linda Hall Library

1582 births
1657 deaths
People from Bologna
17th-century Italian astronomers
17th-century Italian mathematicians
Italian philosophers
Catholic clergy scientists
17th-century Italian Jesuits
Jesuit scientists